The Beijing University of Posts and Telecommunications (BUPT) is a key national university distinguished by the teaching and research in the field of cable communications, wireless communications, computer, and electronic engineering. BUPT is ranked as one of the top engineering schools in China under the Double First Class University Plan and former Project 211. In 2017 the U.S. News & World Report "Best Global Universities" rankings, BUPT is ranked 28th in computer science in the world. BUPT comprises 15 schools, and has an Joint Program with Queen Mary University of London, which is being educated in International School. It is a Chinese state Double First Class University identified by the Ministry of Education.

The university was created in 1955 under the Ministry of Posts and Telecommunications. The name was changed from Institute to University in 1993. It is the most famous and renowned university in the field of telecommunications in China.

BUPT today 
BUPT is one of 56 universities in China authorized to form a Graduate school by the General Office of the Academic Degree of the State Council. The Graduate School has developed graduate programs that cover engineering, science, economics, administration, law and philosophy. It is also one of the first universities in China to have doctoral and master programs.

In the 2005–2006 academic year, BUPT offered 33 undergraduate programs, 34 postgraduate programs, two professional degrees - MBA and Master of Engineering and 12 doctoral programs to domestic and foreign students.

Schools and institutes

Research Institutes 

State Key Laboratory
 State Key Laboratory of Networking and Switching Technology
 State Key Laboratory of Information Photonics and Optical Communications (IPOC)

Provincial Key Laboratory
 Key Laboratory of Universal Wireless Communications of Ministry of Education
 Key Laboratory of Trustworthy Distributed Computing and Service of Ministry of Education
 Beijing Key Laboratory of Intelligent Telecommunication Software and Multimedia
 Beijing Key Laboratory of Network System and Network Culture
 Beijing Key Laboratory of Work Safety Intelligent Monitoring
 Beijing Key Laboratory of Network System Architecture and Convergence

Engineering Laboratory (Research Center)
 National Engineering Laboratory for Disaster Backup and Recovery
 State Engineering Laboratory for Information Security ( Pattern Recognition Laboratory of BUPT)
 Engineering Research Center of Information Networks of the Ministry of Education
 Engineering Research Center of Space Robotics of Ministry of Education

Others
 Research Center of High-level and Characteristic Strategy for University Education of BUPT
 Beijing International scientific and technological cooperation Base for a New Generation of Wireless Network Architecture and Common Platform

Faculty and staff 
There are over 230 professors and 426 associate professors out of the total of 1066 faculty members, among which include honorary professor Gao Kun, 2009 Nobel Prize winner of physics, Professor Ye Peida, academician of the Chinese Academy of Sciences (CAS), Professor Zhou Jiongpan, academician of the Chinese Academy of Engineering (CAE), Professor Chen Junliang, academician of both CAS and CAE, Professor Fang Binxing, academician of CAE and Professor Xu Daxiong, academician of the National Academy of Sciences of the Republic of Kyrgyzstan.  Other notable scholars include Yixin Zhong, Xiaomin Ren, Wanyi Gu, Wenbo Wang, Yixian Yang, Qiaoyan Wen and Jun Xia.

BUPT has over 16,200 full-time students and 12,000 long-distance and E-learning students.  Among full-time students there are 10,800 undergraduates, 4650 master students and 805 doctoral students.

Honors 
Discovered by astronomers with the Beijing Schmidt CCD Asteroid Program, asteroid 101810 Beiyou was named in honor of the University. The official  was published by the Minor Planet Center on 24 September 2020.

References

External links 
 BUPT Official Website

 
Plan 111
Universities and colleges in Beijing
Educational institutions established in 1955
Telecommunications organizations
Telecommunications in China
1955 establishments in China
Telecommunication education